Fisker Inc. is an American automotive company founded by Henrik Fisker and his wife Geeta Gupta-Fisker. Launched in 2016 and based in Manhattan Beach, California, Fisker Inc. is the successor to Fisker Automotive. 

Until 2021, Fisker was working on the development of solid-state battery technologies, but was unable to produce a workable battery.

On July 13, 2020, Fisker Inc. announced an initial public offering on the New York Stock Exchange through a merger with Spartan Energy Acquisition Corp, a SPAC backed by private equity firm Apollo Global Management. On October 30, 2020, Fisker Inc. completed the reverse merger.

History
In 2007, Henrik Fisker and Bernhard Koehler founded Fisker Automotive. The company produced the Fisker Karma, which debuted in 2008 and was first delivered in 2011. Production was suspended in 2012 due to the bankruptcy of its battery supplier A123 Systems, after approximately 2,000 of the vehicles had been sold worldwide. In 2014, Fisker Automotive's assets were purchased by Wanxiang Group, which renamed its new company Karma Automotive. Henrik Fisker retained the Fisker trademarks and brand.

On October 3, 2016, chairman and CEO Henrik Fisker announced the formation of Fisker Inc., an American automaker, with his wife and co-founder Geeta Gupta-Fisker as president and CFO.  On July 8, 2020, Fisker announced the completion of a $50 million Series C financing round funded by Moore Strategic Ventures, the private investment arm of Louis Bacon.

On July 13, 2020, Henrik Fisker announced that Fisker Inc would offer an initial public offering on the New York Stock Exchange through a merger with special-purpose acquisition company Spartan Energy Acquisition Corp. (NYSE:SPAQ), which is backed by private equity firm Apollo Global Management. The deal values Fisker Inc at US$2.9 billion. On October 29, 2020, Fisker announced it completed the reverse merger with Spartan Energy Acquisition Corp (NYSE:SPAQ). As of October 30, 2020, Fisker is publicly listed and traded on the New York Stock Exchange under the ticker symbol FSR. On September 24, 2020, Fisker opened a new technology center in San Francisco, to be a focal point for the development of the company's software and vehicle electronics. On October 14, 2020, Fisker announced its new global headquarters will be located in Manhattan Beach in Los Angeles County, California. 

On June 28, 2021, Fisker stock was added to the Russell 3000 Index. On July 28, 2021, Fisker announced it would invest $10 million in private investment in public equity funding in the EV charging company Allego's merger with Spartan Acquisition Corp III.

In January 2022, Henrik Fisker announced that Fisker Inc. is setting up its first India entity, a global technology center, in Hyderabad. The company has started recruitment for the center, and plans to have a team of 300 software engineers, working mainly on software technologies. The company plans to set up a manufacturing plant in India for the PEAR, in collaboration with Foxconn. Fisker Inc. and Foxconn plan on producing 1 million units of the PEAR initially.

Vehicles

Fisker Ocean

On March 18, 2019, Fisker announced an all-electric SUV to be launched in 2021. It is intended to be the first of three in a lineup of mass-market all-electric vehicles designed by Henrik Fisker and originally planned to be produced in the US. Later named the Fisker Ocean, the company advertises that it will have a range of "close to 300 miles", available on the lowest-cost option. The SUV will be offered in both rear- and all-wheel drive. The company states that it will be supplied by a lithium-ion battery pack with a capacity of around 80 kWh and a solar panel roof as a range extender, adding approximately 1,000 free miles of range per year. The company claims that the Fisker Ocean is being designed with a large number of recycled materials and with sustainability in mind.

Fisker PEAR
The PEAR is an announced "urban" electric vehicle planned by Fisker. The company intends to charge $29,900 before taxes and incentives in the US. The PEAR is planned to be built at Foxconn's plant in Lordstown, Ohio using the Foxconn MIH EV platform with an initial production target of 250,000 annually. As of February 15, 2022, Fisker Inc. has started to take reservations for the PEAR.

Technology initiatives

Unsuccessful nanotech partnership
In 2016, Fisker Inc. teamed up with Nanotech Energy to create a joint venture called Fisker Nanotech, with Jack Kavanaugh as chairman. They worked on developing a next-generation supercapacitor technology using graphene. The proposed hybrid battery using graphene supercapacitors had the potential for improved energy conducting and charging capabilities, and a better cycle life, so that the battery would not need to be swapped out as often as a pure lithium-ion battery. In July 2017, Fisker Inc. ended its joint venture with Nanotech Energy to produce batteries using graphene.

Unsuccessful solid-state battery research
On November 13, 2017, Fisker Inc. announced that it had filed patents on flexible solid-state battery designs, expecting the batteries to be produced on a mass scale around 2023. A prototype of the battery, which included 21700 NCM cells from LG Chem, debuted at the Consumer Electronics Show in January 2018.  Fisker's development team included Fabio Albano, one of the founders of Sakti3, the solid-state battery startup sold to Dyson in 2015. Solid-state batteries have greater energy density and faster charging times than lithium-ion batteries.  In October 2018, Fisker Inc. announced new funding through Caterpillar Venture Capital, a subsidiary of the Caterpillar Inc. heavy-machinery manufacturing company, with the money going toward development of Fisker Inc.'s solid-state battery technology.

In 2021, Fisker dropped its plans to use solid-state batteries; Henrik Fisker stated that the company could not make the technology work successfully.

See also
 Fisker Coachbuild (2005–07)
 Tesla, Inc.
 Faraday Future
 Rivian
 Lucid Motors

References

External links
 
 Henrik Fisker website

Plug-in hybrid vehicle manufacturers
Battery electric vehicle manufacturers
Electric vehicle manufacturers of the United States
Vehicle manufacturing companies established in 2016
American companies established in 2016
2016 establishments in California
Motor vehicle manufacturers based in California
Henrik Fisker
Car brands
Electric vehicle battery manufacturers
2020 initial public offerings
Manufacturing companies based in Los Angeles
Companies listed on the New York Stock Exchange
Special-purpose acquisition companies